Mule is a village in the municipality of Levanger in Trøndelag county, Norway. The Nordlandsbanen railway line also runs through Mule. The village has a school and a daycare centre.

References

Villages in Trøndelag
Levanger